RMRG may refer to:

 Rapid Metro Rail Gurgaon
 Rocky Mountain Rollergirls